The Downtown Deming Historic District, in Deming, New Mexico, is a  historic district which was listed on the National Register of Historic Places in 2013.  It is roughly bounded by Silver Ave., Pine, Maple & Copper Streets.

It includes 63 contributing buildings and two contributing structures.

It includes:
J.A. Mahoney Building (1912), 122 South Gold Avenue, designed by architects Trost & Trost, separately listed on the National Register in 1980
Deming Armory (1916), now the Deming·Luna Mimbres Museum, 301 South Silver Avenue, designed by Trost & Trost

References

External links

Historic districts on the National Register of Historic Places in New Mexico
National Register of Historic Places in Luna County, New Mexico
Victorian architecture in New Mexico

Buildings and structures completed in 1881